Doctor Théophile Peyron was a French naval doctor, who ran the mental hospital of Saint-Paul-de Mausole in a former monastery just outside Saint Rémy de Provence.  Vincent van Gogh was one of his patients.

References 

19th-century French physicians
French psychiatrists